Keith Derek Lawrence (born 25 March 1954) is an English retired professional football central defender who played in the Football League for Brentford.

Career 
A central defender, Lawrence began his career as an apprentice at Chelsea, but was released in 1974 without making a senior appearance. He joined Second Division club West Bromwich Albion on loan in January 1974, but failed to make an appearance during four months at The Hawthorns. Lawrence signed for Fourth Division club Brentford in May 1974 and had two good seasons at Griffin Park, making 89 appearances and scoring two goals, before being surprisingly released by manager John Docherty. Following his release, Lawrence dropped into non-league football and appeared for Wealdstone, Bromley, Tonbridge and Brading Town.

Personal life 
After retiring from football, Lawrence joined the police force.

Career statistics

References

1954 births
Footballers from Sidcup
English footballers
Brentford F.C. players
English Football League players
Living people
Chelsea F.C. players
Wealdstone F.C. players
Southern Football League players
Association football central defenders
Bromley F.C. players
Tonbridge Angels F.C. players
Brading Town F.C. players
Isthmian League players